This is a list of companies founded by Brown University alumni, including attendees who enrolled in degree-programs at Brown but did not eventually graduate. This list is not exhaustive, as it only includes notable companies of which the founding and development history is well recorded by reliable sources. In particular, subsidiaries are listed with their owners in parentheses.

See also 

 List of Brown University people
List of companies founded by Harvard University alumni
List of companies founded by Massachusetts Institute of Technology alumni
List of companies founded by Stanford University alumni
List of companies founded by UC Berkeley alumni
List of companies founded by University of Pennsylvania alumni

References 

Brown University alumni
Brown University alumni
Incomplete lists from January 2021